Luis William Mahendra Leeds (born 6 March 2000) is an Australian-Indonesian racing driver currently competing in the Porsche GT3 Cup Challenge Australia Championship for Supercars Championship team 23Red Racing.

Leeds served as a member of the Red Bull Junior Team in 2016 and is now a development driver for 23Red Racing.

Career summary

Formula 4
Leeds finished 2015 Australian Formula 4 Championship on the sixth place, competing for Dream Motorsport.

In 2016 he became a member of the Red Bull Junior Team and moved to the United Kingdom to compete in F4 British Championship with TRS Arden Junior Racing Team. He ended the season third in the drivers standings with three wins. But it wasn't enough to keep the place in the RB Junior team.

Formula Renault
In 2017 Leeds joined Eurocup Formula Renault 2.0 with Josef Kaufmann Racing. He had two point-scoring finishes, his highest finishing position being seventh place at Silverstone.

Australian Formula 4 Championship 2019

In 2019 Leeds raced with AGI Sport in Australian F4 Championship  where he competed in 18 races, finished on the podium 17 times for 9 wins including the Australian F1 Grand Prix event to go with his other F1 event win at the Mexico F1 in 2015. Leeds went on to win the championship convincingly.

Personal life
Luis Leeds was born on 6 March 2000 in Melbourne by Australian-Indonesian parentage. His mother, Maria Leeds (née Eni), is an Indonesian expatriate and his father Dean Leeds is from Australia. Leeds studied in Ngawi, Indonesia during his primary school days from 2006 until 2012 during his ancestral education career days. In 2012 Leeds was moved back to Australia to pursue his racing career.

Leeds is currently practicing Christian Protestant who attends Protestant prayer service both in Australia and Indonesia.

Racing record

Career summary

† As Leeds was a guest driver, he was ineligible for points.

Complete F4 British Championship results 
(key) (Races in bold indicate pole position; races in italics indicate fastest lap)

Complete Formula Renault Eurocup results
(key) (Races in bold indicate pole position) (Races in italics indicate fastest lap)

Complete FIA Motorsport Games results

Complete S5000 Australian Drivers' Championship results

References

External links
 
 

2000 births
Living people
Australian people of Indonesian descent
Racing drivers from Melbourne
Formula Ford drivers
ADAC Formula 4 drivers
British F4 Championship drivers
Toyota Racing Series drivers
Formula Renault Eurocup drivers
Formula Renault 2.0 NEC drivers
Arden International drivers
Australian racing drivers
Josef Kaufmann Racing drivers
Garry Rogers Motorsport drivers
FIA Motorsport Games drivers
Team Meritus drivers
Tasman Series drivers
NACAM F4 Championship drivers
Australian F4 Championship drivers